Las Delicias is a and administrative neighborhood of Madrid belonging to the district of Arganzuela.

References

Wards of Madrid
Arganzuela